Telepictures (also known as Telepictures Productions; formerly known as Telepictures Distribution and Telepictures Corporation) is an American television show and filmmaking company, currently operating as a subsidiary of Warner Bros. Television Studios. Telepictures was established in 1979 by David Salzman, Michael Jay Solomon, and Michael Garin as a television syndication firm.

History

Early years 
The company syndicated Rankin-Bass's programming and specials that were produced from 1974 to 1988, including new and successful animated series, such as ThunderCats and SilverHawks. Telepictures bought Rankin-Bass outright in 1983. In addition, Telepictures had syndicated numerous television programs such as My Favorite Martian, Here's Lucy, Love Connection, and the original The People's Court with Judge Joseph Wapner. Telepictures also operated a small publishing arm, which published magazines, such as The Muppets Magazine and Challenge of the GoBots Magazine. In 1983, Frank Konigsberg's Konigsberg Co. was merged into Telepictures.

On March 21, 1984, it signed a distribution deal with Dick Clark Productions in order to expand its activities in order to distribute virtually all of the Dick Clark productions and TV specials.

Lorimar-Telepictures 
In January 1986, the company merged with Merv Adelson and Lee Rich's Lorimar Television, creating Lorimar-Telepictures and assumed production and distribution of shows like Dallas and Knots Landing. The company also began distribution of first-run episodes of Mama's Family in June 1986 in television.

The company briefly dabbled into owning television station by purchasing charter Fox affiliate WPGH-TV in Pittsburgh and attempted to purchase then-CBS affiliate WTVJ in Miami. However, after CBS made a half-hearted attempt to purchase Fox affiliate WCIX from Taft Broadcasting (CBS would later make a more serious attempt to purchase the station two years later and succeeded; it is now CBS owned-and-operated station WFOR-TV), Telepictures backed off from purchasing WTVJ. (NBC eventually purchased the station; it remains an NBC O&O today.) The company would then subsequently sell WPGH-TV to Renaissance Broadcasting after only a year in ownership; WPGH-TV, which went through several owners in the 1980s, would not have stable ownership until current owner Sinclair Broadcast Group (which had been outbid by Telepictures for the station in 1986) bought the station from Renaissance in 1990.

Purchase by Warner Communications 
In 1987, Lorimar Television was created as a separate production entity of Lorimar Telepictures. Around this time, the company purchased a 9% stake in Warner Communications (now Warner Bros. Discovery), which set off talks about a possible merger between two entertainment entities. The following year, Warner Communications finally purchased the company. Lorimar Television became a separate subsidiary of Warner Bros. Television Studios until 1993, while Lorimar-Telepictures unit was folded into Warner Bros. Television Distribution. Telepictures became Telepictures Productions in 1990, a producer of syndicated programming that Warner Bros. Television would distribute. Later on that year, David Salzman, founding partner left Lorimar to start Warner-affiliated production company with Millennium Productions, covering affiliated houses like Lorimar Television and Telepictures Productions.

Beginning in 1994, certain Telepictures shows, such as Extra, were co-produced by then-sister company Time Inc., under the name Time-Telepictures Television. Most shows produced by them bore a copyright for "TTT West Coast", while Sports Illustrated videos released during the timeframe bore a copyright for "TTT East Coast" instead. The joint venture ceased in 2003 and TTT productions were brought under the main Telepictures name.

In 2004, John Rieber and Alex Duda via Streamroller Entertainment set up an overall deal with the Telepictures company.

Telepictures Distribution 
In 1995, Time Warner Entertainment formed Telepictures Distribution as a division of Warner Bros. Domestic Television Distribution, running over the oversight of then-EVP Scott Carlin. The company distributed non-Warner Bros. produced programming to which the syndication rights have been licensed to Warner and/or Turner as well as Warner properties.

Upon Time Warner's purchase of Turner in 1996, some of the key assets of Turner Program Services was folded into the company.

In 2003, Telepictures Distribution was folded into Warner Bros. Television Distribution.

Shows produced by Telepictures 
 The Ellen DeGeneres Show (2003–2022)
 Extra (1994–present)
 Judge Mathis (1999–present)
 The People's Court (1981–1993, 1997–2023)
 TMZ on TV (2007–2021; sold to Fox Corporation and now distributed through Fox First Run with ad sales handled by CBS Media Ventures)
 The Real (2013–2022)
 Let's Ask America (2012–2015)
 Love Connection (1983–1994, 1998–1999, 2017–2018)
 Rituals (1984–1985)
 The All New Let's Make a Deal (1984–1986)
 Catchphrase (1985–1986)
 ThunderCats (1985–1989)
 SilverHawks (1986)
 Trump Card (1990–1991)
 Fun House (1990–1991, for Fox)
The Jesse Jackson Show (1990)
 The Jenny Jones Show (1991–2003)
 The Jane Whitney Show (1992–1994)
 Carnie! (1995–1996)
 The Rosie O'Donnell Show (1996–2002, not to be confused with The Rosie Show on OWN)
 In Person with Maureen O'Boyle (1996–1997)
 Change of Heart (1998–2003)
 The Queen Latifah Show (1999–2001)  
 Street Smarts (2000–2005)
 The Caroline Rhea Show (2002–2003)
 Celebrity Justice (2002–2005)
 SlamBall (2002-03)
 Are You Hot? (2003)
 The Sharon Osbourne Show (2003–2004)
 The Larry Elder Show (2004–2005)
 The Tyra Banks Show (2005–2010)
 The Dr. Keith Ablow Show (2006–2007)
 The Bonnie Hunt Show (2008–2010)
 The Jennifer Hudson Show (2022–present)
 Judge Jeanine Pirro (2008–2011)
 Lopez Tonight (2009–2011)
 Dr. Drew's Lifechangers (2011–2012)
 Anderson Live (2011–2013)
 Bethenny (2013–2014)
 Just Keke (2014)
 Crime Watch Daily (2015–2018)
 Mad TV (2016 revival series)
 Ellen's Game of Games (2017–2021)
 RuPaul (2019)

Television stations formerly owned by Telepictures

References

External links 
 
 

 
1978 establishments in California
1989 mergers and acquisitions
American companies established in 1978
Companies based in Culver City, California
Film distributors of the United States
Entertainment companies based in California
Entertainment companies established in 1978
Mass media companies established in 1978
Television syndication distributors
Warner Bros. divisions
Warner Bros. Television Studios